Sternotomis centralis is a species of beetle in the family Cerambycidae. It was described by Hintz in 1911. It is known from the Democratic Republic of the Congo and Angola.

References

Sternotomini
Beetles described in 1911